Betty Jean Maycock Harrington (born December 13, 1942) is a former Olympic gymnast from Cleveland, Ohio. Maycock was a member of the American gymnastics team that placed ninth at the 1960 Summer Olympics.  Prior to the Olympics, she was part of the first collegiate women's gymnastics team in the United States at Kent State University in 1959 while still a student at Kent State High School. She also won four medals at the 1959 Pan American Games. Following the Olympics, she returned to college, graduating cum laude from Kent State in 1964, and later earned a Ph.D. in Child Development from the University of Maryland.  She was married to Robert Sutton Harrington (1942–1993) in 1976, and has two daughters, Amy and Ann. She currently works with the organization Microcredit in Africa, which implements microcredit projects in Niger.

References

1942 births
Kent State University alumni
Living people
Sportspeople from Cleveland
University of Maryland, College Park alumni
American female artistic gymnasts
Gymnasts at the 1960 Summer Olympics
Olympic gymnasts of the United States
Pan American Games medalists in gymnastics
Pan American Games silver medalists for the United States
Gymnasts at the 1959 Pan American Games
Medalists at the 1959 Pan American Games
21st-century American women